Leviathan is an American black metal solo project that started in 1998 by Jef Whitehead under the pseudonym Wrest.

On all Leviathan albums, Wrest records all instruments and performs vocals on his own. Despite having early problems with the release of the fourth album Massive Conspiracy Against All Life, it was released March 24, 2008 in Europe and on March 25, 2008 in North America. Additionally, Wrest has collaborated with the band Sunn O))), and he was an active member of the U.S. black metal supergroup Twilight from its formation until it disbanded in 2014. He has stated in interviews that he has been playing drums longer than any other instrument and that the drums are his instrument of choice. Wrest also played and recorded all instruments as well as vocals in his other project, Lurker of Chalice, which had two demos and one full-length album in 2005 released before it was dissolved. Whitehead also writes all the lyrics for Leviathan but has noted, "I don't consider myself a poet, by any means."

Whitehead briefly ended Leviathan after the release of Massive Conspiracy Against All Life in 2008, allegedly due to a legal struggle between himself and Moribund Records. Due to these issues, Wrest felt as though the project had no future.

Whitehead was arrested on January 9, 2011 on charges of sexual assault and domestic violence. Wrest has confirmed in an interview that the events surrounding his arrest and the accuser have inspired the music and theme of True Traitor, True Whore, which was released through Profound Lore Records after Wrest signed with them in August 2011;  he concurrently announced that he had revived Leviathan. Faced with six charges stemming from the incident, Wrest maintained his innocence and took the case to trial. In May 2012, Wrest was found not guilty of all charges except for one count of aggravated domestic battery.

Leviathan's latest album, Scar Sighted was released on 3rd March 2015 through Profound Lore Records. In 2018, Whitehead revealed that he was working on an eighth Leviathan record titled Die to This.

Discography

Studio albums
 2003 - The Tenth Sub Level of Suicide
 2004 - Tentacles of Whorror
 2005 - A Silhouette in Splinters
 2008 - Massive Conspiracy Against All Life
 2011 - True Traitor, True Whore
 2015 - Scar Sighted
 TBD - Die to This

EP's and Split releases
 2003 - Live In Eternal Sin / The Speed of Darkness (split with Iuvenes)
 2004 - Leviathan & Crebain (split with Crebain)
 2004 - Black Metal Against the World (split with Ad Hominem, Funeral Winds and Eternity)
 2004 - Leviathan & Xasthur (split with Xasthur)
 2005 - Portrait in Scars (split with Blackdeath)
 2006 - Leviathan & Sapthuran (split with Sapthuran)
 2006 - The Speed of Darkness (EP)
 2006 - The Blind Wound (EP)
 2009 - Sic Luceat Lux (split with Acherontas)
 2014 - Leviathan / Krieg (split with Krieg)
 2018 - In the Valley of Death, Where Black Metal Is King (split with Nachtmystium, digital release)
 2018 - Crawl / Leviathan (split with Crawl)

Demos
 2000 - Leviathan
 2000 - Time End
 2000 - Three
 2000 - MisanthropicNecroBlasphemy
 2000 - Black of Cult
 2000 - Shadow of No Light
 2001 - Seven
 2001 - Eight
 2001 - Nine (Inclement Derision)
 2001 - Ten
 2001 - Eleven
 2002 - Howl Mockery at the Cross
 2002 - White Devil, Black Metal
 2002 - The Tenth Sub Level of Suicide
 2002 - Fifteen

Compilation albums
 2001 - Intolerance
 2001 - Sacrifice Love at the Altar of War
 2002 - Verräter (2 CDs)
 2005 - Demos Two Thousand
 2005 - Howl Mockery at the Cross
 2016 - Leviathan (5 CD boxed set)
 2017 - The First Sublevel Of Suicide
 2018 - Unfailing Fall Into Naught
 2021 - Portrait in Scars / The Speed of Darkness
 2022 - Shadow of No Light

Other appearances
 2005 - "Hissing and Sullen" on Destroyers From The Western Skies: As Night Devours The Sun
 2007 - "My War" on Within the Church of Thee Overlords
 2015 - "My War" Flexi-disc single

Lineup
 Wrest (Jef Whitehead) – all instruments, vocals (Twilight, Lurker of Chalice, Nachtmystium, GiftHorse, Steeltoes, GASM)

References

External links
 Original label website
 Official label website
 Interview with Wrest
 One Man Metal, Vice documentary in three parts, featuring Wrest

Black metal musical groups from California
Musical groups established in 1998
One-man bands
Tumult Records artists
Musical groups from San Francisco